Museum of Life is a 2010 BBC Two documentary, that takes a look behind the scenes at the Natural History Museum, London. It is introduced and co-presented by Jimmy Doherty, who was a volunteer at the Natural History Museum ten years previously.  Other presenters are Kate Bellingham, Liz Bonnin, Mark Carwardine, and Chris van Tulleken.

The six-part program ranges over topics such as the care and maintenance of the museum's 70 million specimens, and the relevance of research by the museum scientists to contemporary problems such as biodiversity loss and the spread of tropical disease.

Episodes

References

External links
 
 

2010 British television series debuts
2010 British television series endings
BBC television documentaries about science
British documentary television series
Nature educational television series
Documentary films about nature
Films set in museums
Natural History Museum, London